Ivan Havránek (born 10 March 1964) is a former ice dancer who competed for Czechoslovakia. With Viera Řeháková (Mináríková), he placed ninth at the 1988 European Championships and 15th at the 1988 Winter Olympics.

His mother, Milada Havránková, was a figure skating coach in Karviná.

Competitive highlights 
With Řeháková (Mináríková):

References 

1964 births
Czechoslovak male ice dancers
Living people
Olympic figure skaters of Czechoslovakia
Figure skaters at the 1988 Winter Olympics